Atkin Kaua (born 4 April 1996) is a Solomon Islands footballer who plays as a midfielder for the Laugu United. He made his debut for the national team on 5 October 2016, in their 3–0 loss against New Caledonia.

Club career
Kaua was educated at Nelson College and played college football in New Zealand. In 2018 he was named in the Oceanian's Eleven Series as one of the 11 biggest talents in Oceania.

International career

International goals
Scores and results list the Solomon Islands' goal tally first.

References

External links

Living people
1996 births
Association football midfielders
Solomon Islands international footballers
Solomon Islands footballers
Western United F.C. players
Marist F.C. players
People educated at Nelson College